Emanuele Foà (16 August 1892 – 9 October 1949) was an Italian engineer and engineering physicist, known for his contribution to mathematical fluid dynamics. In particular he proved the first known uniqueness theorem for the solutions to the three-dimensional Navier–Stokes equations for incompressible fluids in bounded domains.

Life and academic career
He was born in Savigliano, in a Jewish family of distinguished professionals and officials: his father, Teodoro Foà, was a military physician serving as a major the Royal Italian Army, who died at the age of 42 due to the viral fevers he contracted during the Eritrea war campaign. Despite having lost his father at a young age and having a disabled sister, he succeeded in studying engineering at the Polytechnic University of Turin thanks to a scholarship. The outbreak of World War I in Italy in 1915 forced him to interrupt his engineering studies: he joined the army and served as an artillery officer for the years 1916 and 1917. On 28 October 1917, during the battle of Caporetto, he was taken prisoner and spent a year in a prisoner camp located in Germany.

At the end of the war, notwithstanding his health problems, he successfully completed his university studies: he got his Laurea degree in industrial engineering at the Polytechnic University of Turin in August 1919. From 1 December 1919 he started to work at his alma mater, as assistant professor to the chair of thermal engineering, which at the time was held by Benedetto Luigi Montel. In 1927 he participated and won a competitive examination for a professorship in engineering physics at the then called "Royal School of Engineering of Bologna": in 1928 he left Turin for Bologna, succeeding, after a brief time period, to Luigi Donati who had held the chair for several decades. The very same year he met Dario Graffi, who had earlier become assistant professor to the chair of engineering physics: their cordial relations became over time a deep and tenacious friendship, lasted until Foà's death.

In Bologna, he passionately devoted himself to teaching as his course handouts, published in several editions, testify: the same time  was fruitful for his researches activity, and in 1930 he was appointed ordinary professor.

The years from 1938 to 1945: the "Italian Racial Laws" and the World War II
His teaching at the university was interrupted in 1938, the year the Italian Government approved the "Racial Laws", "unreasonable, before being unjust". Forced by the law to an early retirement, the Council of the faculty of engineering substituted him with Graffi: he was very happy with the council choice, due to their friendship and mutual esteem. For his part Graffi, who could not adopt Foà's handouts due to prohibition imposed by the laws on publications by Jewish authors, published them under his name: cautiously, he kept sending to Foà's house students for private lessons, in order to help him supplement his small retirement pension.

During World War II period, Foà and his wife managed to stay in Bologna but had to change their accommodation frequently, being hosted by friendly families.
In October 1943, being warned by Dino Zanobetti about a raid of the police, he and his wife left their house and went to an apartment made available by Dante Piccioli, a wealthy engineer and friend of them. More than a month later, on 7 December, Bologna was bombed and the apartment where Foà and his wife resided was destroyed: being at home, Foà was severely wounded at the right leg and was brought to the Sant'Orsola Hospital.

Honors
In 1933 he was elected corresponding member of the Accademia delle Scienze dell'Istituto di Bologna and, after being reintegrated in his role of professor at the University of Bologna in 1945, he became ordinary member in 1947. Also in 1947, jointly with some fellow engineers, he founded the Bologna Section of the Associazione Termotecnica Italiana, and was elected as his first president.

Work

Teaching activity

Research activity

Selected publications
.
.
. In this article Foà proves his uniqueness theorem for classical solutions to the Navier-Stokes equation.
.
.
.
.

See also
David Dolidze
Euler equations
Fluid mechanics
Olga Ladyzhenskaya
James Serrin

Notes

References

Biographical and general references
. The slides of a conference held by Alessandro Cocchi, emeritus professor of engineering physics at the University of Bologna, on the history of the Laboratory of Engineering Physics of the University.
. An obituary written by one of his fellow students at the Polytechnic University of Turin, with a list of his publications.
. "Contribution to the history of Engineering Physics in Italy" is a short historical survey giving details on life and work of several Italian scholars on Engineering Physics.
. A short obituary written by the Dean of the Faculty of Engineering at the University of Bologna, for the "Yearboook of the Academic years 1948–1949 – 1949–1950": a photograph of Foà is included.
. The Inaugural Address of the director of the Polytechnic University of Turin, for the "Yearboook of the Academic Year 1928–1929".
. An obituary, with a list of his publications.
. Recollections of Giulio Supino and Emanuele Foà by Dino Zanobetti, professor emeritus of Electrical engineering and one of their former students.

Scientific references
. In this article Graffi extends to compressible viscous fluids a uniqueness theorem for the solutions to Navier-Stokes equation in bounded domains, previously proved only for incompressible fluids by Emanuele Foà and rediscovered by David Dolidze.
, available at Gallica. A short research note announcing the results of the author on the uniqueness of solutions of the Navier-Stokes equations on unbounded domains under the hypothesis of constant fluid velocity at infinity.
. In this paper Graffi extends his uniqueness theorem for the solutions of Navier-Stokes equations on unbounded domains relaxing previously assumed hypotheses on the behaviour of the velocity at infinity.
. This article is the published text of a conference Graffi held at the Seminario Matematico e Fisico di Milano, exposing mainly his researches on the uniqueness of the solutions to the Navier-Stokes equations.
.
.

External links
. The biographical entry about Emanuele Foà in the "Dizionario Biografico degli Italiani (Biographical Dictionary of Italians)" section of the Enciclopedia Treccani.

1892 births
1949 deaths
20th-century Italian Jews
Jewish physicists
People from Savigliano
Fluid dynamicists
20th-century Italian mathematicians
Engineers from Bologna
20th-century Italian physicists
Polytechnic University of Turin alumni
Academic staff of the University of Bologna
Academic staff of the Polytechnic University of Turin
20th-century Italian engineers